The Leblanc River is a tributary of the De La Galette River, flowing on the south shore of the Gouin Reservoir, in the territory of the town of La Tuque, in the Mauricie administrative region, in Quebec, in Canada.

The Leblanc River runs successively in the Decelles and Leblanc townships, south of the Gouin Reservoir and on the west side of the upper Saint-Maurice River. Forestry is the main economic activity of this valley; recreational tourism activities, second.

Some secondary forest roads are in use nearby for forestry and recreational tourism activities.

The surface of the Leblanc River is usually frozen from mid-November to the end of April, however, safe ice circulation is generally from early December to late March.

Geography

Toponymy 
The term "Leblanc" is a family name of French origin.

The toponym "Leblanc River" was formalized on August 17, 1978 at the Commission de toponymie du Quebec.

Notes and references

See also 

Rivers of Mauricie
Tributaries of the Saint-Maurice River
La Tuque, Quebec